Solo is a 1993 science fiction novel by Robert Mason. The book was Mason's second novel; he had previously written Weapon and a memoir about his experiences in Vietnam titled Chickenhawk.

Plot introduction
When the self-aware Pentagon-built robot, Solo, goes AWOL, the Pentagon uses its reserve robot, Nimrod, as bait luring Solo into a trap meant to destroy him, and setting the stage for a cyborg confrontation.

Plot summary

Solo, a robot designed by the US Government as a hyper intelligent super assassin, goes AWOL on his mission in Nicaragua, and finds himself at the bottom of a lake. Reaching the surface Solo realizes that he needs to recharge, and eventually makes his way to New York, acquiring friends along the way. A widowed bag lady named Laura, quickly befriends Solo and benefits not only from Solo's friendship, but his protection. Solo is bent on his self-imposed mission to rescue his younger "brother," Nimrod, a newer, more advanced robot like Solo. Meanwhile, agents of the Government maneuver to destroy the renegade Solo at any cost.

Self-determination on the part of the main character.

Film, TV or theatrical adaptations
The feature film Solo created in 1996, is an adaptation of the first book of the series Weapon, and though it borrows the name of the title character from both novels, it is not considered to be true to the source material.

Sources, references, external links, quotations
Sample Chapters from Robert Mason's Website
Author's Note on Weapon
 Plot Description Summary for Solo

1992 American novels
American science fiction novels
Sequel novels
Novels set in New York City
Novels set in Nicaragua